Petre Maxim is a Romanian sprint canoeist who competed in the late 1960s and early 1970s. He won two gold medals in the C-2 10000 m event at the ICF Canoe Sprint World Championships, earning them in 1966 and 1970.

References

Living people
Romanian male canoeists
Year of birth missing (living people)
ICF Canoe Sprint World Championships medalists in Canadian